The Provisional Government of National Unity was a puppet government formed by the decree of the State National Council on 28 June 1945 as a result of reshuffling the Soviet-backed Provisional Government of the Republic of Poland established by the Polish Workers' Party through inclusion of politicians from the close political sphere of Stanisław Mikołajczyk, the former prime minister of the Polish government-in-exile based in London. Inclusion of the latter group provided an excuse for the Western allies to approve tacitly the fait accompli of Poland becoming part of the Soviet sphere of influence, and to legitimise the Warsaw government while withdrawing their recognition of the Polish government-in-exile.

Background

When Poland was conquered by Germany in 1939, a new government-in-exile was established in Paris (and moved to London after 1940 Nazi invasion of France). The government-in-exile was recognized by the British government, and controlled the main Polish resistance force, the Armia Krajowa (Home Army).

In 1943, the PPR and some other left-wing resistance groups formed the KRN as a national government of Poland, in rivalry to the exile government. In July 1944, the KRN proclaimed the Polish Committee of National Liberation (the "Lublin Committee" or PKWN) in territory liberated from Germany by the Soviet Army. The exile government denounced this, but was powerless to interfere, especially after the Armia Krajowa was largely destroyed in the 1944 Warsaw Uprising.

Poland was not covered by the Percentages Agreement. Despite renaming the PKWN into the Provisional Government of the Republic of Poland (RTRP), Stalin promised during the Yalta Conference in February 1945 free elections in Poland, thus contradicting his prior stated position. By that time, Soviet forces had overrun nearly all of Poland, giving them and the KRN effective control. The US and Britain tacitly accepted this at Yalta, in return for Stalin's promise of free elections in Poland. The exile government was dependent on the support of the British and American governments, which did not grasp communist intentions and pressured the exile government to cooperate with the KRN. The Polish exile government still tried to hold out, but was ignored. A group including Stanisław Mikołajczyk, Prime Minister in 1943-1944, broke with the rest of the exiles and began seeking a deal with the communists.

Establishment
The TRJN was a result of negotiations held in Moscow from 17 June to 21 June 1945, between the PPR (Polish communists), the Soviet Union, and Mikołajczyk, who had created the Polish People's Party (Polskie Stronnictwo Ludowe, PSL) as the political vehicle for his participation. The PSL was a centrist organization and continuation of the prewar Polish agrarian movement. The pre-war People's Party also supported Mikołajczyk.

The TRJN government was composed of:
Prime Minister: Edward Osóbka-Morawski (Polish Socialist Party)
Deputy Prime Minister, Minister of Regained Territories: Władysław Gomułka (PPR)
Deputy Prime Minister, Minister of Agriculture and Agricultural Reform: Stanisław Mikołajczyk (PSL)

The entire government was composed of:
 PPR: 7 ministers
 Socialist Party: 6 ministers
 People's Party: 3 ministers
 PSL: 3 ministers
 Democratic Party: 2 ministers

The exile government did not recognize the TRJN.

Subsequent events
The communists had no intention of giving the opposition any real power, or carrying out the promised 'free and fair' elections. The members of the opposition that received government positions were kept in check by their deputies and staff, loyal to the communists, so they had little real power.

On 21 June, General Leopold Okulicki, former Commander of the Polish Home Army was sentenced to 10 years of imprisonment in Moscow for the alleged sabotage against the Soviet Army.  Ten other Poles were given similar sentences in the Trial of the Sixteen.  On 24 December 1946, Okulicki died in Butyrka prison.

The TRJN was already bound by the "Treaty of Friendship, Mutual Help, and Cooperation" with the USSR which the Provisional Government had signed on 21 April. This treaty formed the basis for Soviet interference in Poland's internal politics for the next 40 years.

On 5 July 1945, the TRJN was recognized by the United States. It was soon also recognized by the other major Allies, France and the United Kingdom. It was not recognized by the Vatican.

On 6 July, while the Polish government-in-exile maintained its existence, both the United States and the United Kingdom formally withdrew the recognition of it.

On 10 July, Osóbka-Morawski announced the expulsion of all Germans from Poland.

From 17 July to 2 August, a delegation from the TRJN attended the 1945 Potsdam Conference.

On 16 August, a Soviet-Polish border agreement was signed in Moscow. Before the end of August, Poland agreed to cede the eastern provinces to the Soviet Union and officially recognized the eastern border based on a slightly modified Curzon line.

On 16 October, delegates of the TRJN signed the United Nations Charter and Poland became a member of the United Nations.

The 'free and fair' elections promised by the TRJN were postponed until the communists were sure they could control the election process. In the meantime, they increased repressions of opposition members, who were bribed, threatened, delegalised, or even murdered. In the words of Gomułka, the goal of the communists was to be the "hegemon of the nation" and nothing would stop them.  On 30 June 1946, they tested their control during the 3xTAK referendum, falsifying the results and claiming 68% support.

Two great reforms carried out by TRJN were the nationalization decree and the Three-Year Plan (of 1947–49), both issued in 1946. The nationalization decree gave the government control over every enterprise which employed more than 50 people; by the end of the year, 90% of the country's industry was controlled by the government.

Notes of Stalin's Speech during a Reception at the Kremlin on 23 June 1944 
"Mr. Zurawski is right to say that blood is being shed between the Polish and Russian people. For centuries, Poland and Russia were at war with each other, and only Germany benefited. The Poles occupied Moscow twice - the Russians abandoned them. In the past, Poles had many reasons to hate Russia. Russia is more responsible for the centuries-long relationship between Poland and Russia because it is stronger than Poland. Old Tsarist Russia and its people carried out a policy of repression against the Poles. Russia needs new people to change the policies of Tsarist Russia."

Dissolution 

The communists rigged the Polish legislative elections of January 1947. The new parliament (Sejm Ustawodawczy) replaced the KRN; it named a new government headed by Józef Cyrankiewicz. On 19 January 1947, TRJN was dissolved and passed its prerogatives as the government of Poland to the new government.

See also

 Polish Committee of National Liberation (PKWN) - 1944 and 1945
 Provisional Government of the Republic of Poland (RTRP) - 1945
 Polish People's Party (1945–49)
 Polish People's Republic (PRL) - 1944 to 1952 (unofficially), 1952 to 1989 (officially)
 People's Army of Poland (LWP)
 Polish government-in-exile

References

Further reading
 Davies, Norman, 1982 and several reprints. God's Playground. 2 vols. New York: Columbia Univ. Press.  and 

.02
Government of Poland
Polish People's Republic
Provisional governments
1945 in Poland
1946 in Poland
1947 in Poland
Poland–Soviet Union relations
Political history of Poland
Stalinism in Poland
States and territories established in 1945
States and territories disestablished in 1947
1945 establishments in Poland
1947 disestablishments in Poland
Contemporary history of Poland
Former socialist republics